Didogobius splechtnai is a  species of goby native to the Mediterranean Sea along the coasts of Spain and Italy where they inhabit caves with sandy substrates at depths from . The specific name honours Professor Heinz Splechtna (1933-1996), a marine biologist at the University of Vienna.

References

splechtnai
Fish of Europe
Fish of the Mediterranean Sea
Fish described in 1995